Watten was a railway station located at the east end of Loch Watten, Highland between Halkirk and Wick, Scotland.

The station opened on 28 July 1874. The station master from 1876 to 1909 was Mr. Phimster.

It was one of a number of smaller stations on the Far North Line which were closed in 1960.

Sources

References

External links 
 RAILSCOT on Sutherland and Caithness Railway
 RAILSCOT page on Watten

Disused railway stations in Caithness
Former Highland Railway stations
Railway stations in Great Britain opened in 1874
Railway stations in Great Britain closed in 1960